The 2022 Big Ten women's soccer tournament was the postseason women's soccer tournament for the Big Ten Conference for the 2022 season. It was held from October 30 to November 6, 2022. As the tournament champion, Penn State, earned the Big Ten Conference's automatic berth into the 2022 NCAA Division I women's soccer tournament.

Seeding 
Eight Big Ten schools will participate in the tournament. Teams are seeded by conference record.

Bracket

Schedule

Quarterfinals

Semifinals

Final

Statistics

Goalscorers

All-Tournament team

References

External links 
 Big Ten Conference Women's Soccer
 Big Ten Women's Soccer Tournament Central

Big Ten Women's Soccer Tournament